Major General Larry A.R. Wijeratne USP, SLA (1950 – 14 May 1998) was the former Brigade Commander of 51-4 Brigade based in Jaffna.

Early life and family 
He completed his education at Nugawela Central College. At school, he excelled in both studies, sports alike and was a Queen's Scout. His wife was Brigadier Indira Wijeratne of the Sri Lanka Army Legal Branch and he was the father of two sons Bhagya and Dulanjaya.

Career 
After leaving school he joined the army as an officer cadet and was commissioned as a Second Lieutenant in the Sri Lanka Artillery. During his career he held many positions within the army including that of instructor at the Army Training Centre, Diyatalawa (now the Sri Lanka Military Academy). He had been awarded the Uttama Seva Padakkama, Sri Lanka Armed Services Long Service Medal, North and East Operations Medal, Purna Bhumi Padakkama, Operation Wadamarachchi Medal, Riviresa Campaign Services Medal, and 50th Independence Anniversary Commemoration Medal for his service during the course of his military career.

Brigadier Larry Wijeratne was appointed as commanding officer of 51-4 Brigade at Vadamarachchi in Jaffna in 1997.

Death 
On the last day of his duty assignment he was killed by an LTTE suicide bomber at Velvetiturai in Jaffna on 14 May 1998, when he attended a Jaffna traders' felicitation lunch just before leaving on transfer as deputy commandant of the Kotelawela Defence Academy. Brigadier Larry Wijeratne was posthumously promoted to the rank of Major General.

External links 
Official Website of Sri Lanka Army
Ministry of Defence, Sri Lanka
MIC-Military Intelligence Corps

References 

 THE DRIFT IN JAFFNA: THE URGENCY OF A POLITICAL SETTLEMENT & THE IMPORTANCE OF LARRY WIJERATNE'S LEGACY., THE UNIVERSITY TEACHERS FOR HUMAN RIGHTS, JAFFNA (UTHR(Jaffna)) Sri Lanka
 Patterns of Global Terrorism: 1998 Asia Overview
 Tigers send a deadly message, By Sudha Ramachandran

The Larry Wijeratne That I Knew

1950 births
1998 deaths
Sri Lankan major generals
Sinhalese military personnel
Assassinated military personnel
Assassinated Sri Lankan people
Terrorist incidents in Sri Lanka in 1998
Suicide bombings in Sri Lanka
Sri Lanka Military Academy graduates
People killed during the Sri Lankan Civil War
Sri Lanka Artillery officers